Raubal is a German surname. Notable people with the surname include:

 Angela Raubal, née Hitler (1883–1949), elder half-sister of Adolf Hitler
  (born 1968), German icehockey player
 Geli Raubal (1908–1931), Adolf Hitler's half niece
 Leo Rudolf Raubal Jr. (1906–1977), teacher, soldier and manager

See also
Roubal
Rauball

German-language surnames